Bebearia raeveli is a butterfly in the family Nymphalidae. It is found in the Central African Republic and south-eastern Cameroon.

References

Butterflies described in 1989
raeveli